Ernest Edgar Nixson (25 May 1886 – 23 February 1971) was a British wrestler. He competed in the men's Greco-Roman light heavyweight at the 1908 Summer Olympics.

References

External links
 

1886 births
1971 deaths
British male sport wrestlers
Olympic wrestlers of Great Britain
Wrestlers at the 1908 Summer Olympics
Sportspeople from London